The Wangjaesan Light Music Band is a light music (kyŏngŭmak) group in North Korea. It is one of two (with Pochonbo Electronic Ensemble) popular music groups that were established by North Korea in the 1980s, both named after places where Kim Il-sung fought the Japanese in 1930s. It takes its name from Mount Wangjae in Onsong-gun, North Hamgyong Province, on the border with China (Japan puppet state Manchukuo in that period), where Kim Il-sung is said to have held a meeting for anti-Japanese activities in 1933.

The band was established by the North Korean leader Kim Jong-il, son and heir of Kim Il-sung, on 22 July 1983. Its music was often broadcast over Korean Central Broadcasting Station channels such as Radio Pyongyang and as test card music for Korean Central Television. The Wangjaesan Dance Troupe is part of the group.

Alleged executions and disbandment 
On 29 August 2013, The Chosun Ilbo reported that key members of the Wangjaesan Light Music Band were made to watch the execution by firing squad of other musicians and dancers from their band, as well as members of the Unhasu Orchestra and the singer Hyon Song-wol, on the orders of Kim Jong-un. The Wangjaesan Light Music Band was subsequently disbanded. Some experts however were dubious of this claim, such as Barbara Demick, author of Nothing to Envy. Demick told Business Insider "...it is hard to trust this stuff. A lot of deliberate misinformation out there." Chad O'Carroll of NK News, a North Korean analyst website, stated: "You've got to remember that a lot of the time the source is South Korean and it's in their interest to distort or perhaps weave the truth every now and then". John Delury from the Yonsei University in Seoul told The Guardian: "This stuff gets planted regularly in media outlets and then quickly goes viral. There's a global appetite for any North Korea story and the more salacious the better. Some of it is probably true — but a great deal of it is probably not". Delury also added: "The normal standards of journalism are thrown out of the window because the attitude is: 'It's North Korea — no one knows what's going on in there'". Hyon Song-wol was later shown to be alive.

The South Korean reports came approximately a month after the Workers' Party of Korea Central Committee had issued a message of anniversary congratulations to the troupe.

Reappearance
In 2015, the band reunited for the "Songs Full of Memories" concert series (February–March) and the joint performance "Great Party, Rosy Korea" in October.

Members

Singers
 People's Actress Ryom Chong
 O Jong Yun
 Kim Myong Ok
 Jong Myong Sin
 Kim Son Hui
 Hyon Song Wol
 Kim Jong Nyo
 Jang Jong Ae
 Hwang Suk Kyong
 Kim Song Ok
 Jong Sun Nyo
 Kim Ok Sun
 Merited Actress Pak Bok Hui
 Pak In Ok
 Jang Yun Hui
 Kim Hwa Suk
 Kim Hui Ok
 Ri Ok Hwa
 Ko Kyong Ran
 Ryom Tong Son
 Kim Jong Nyo
 Kim Sun Hui
 Choe Kwang Ho
 Kwon Mi Hwa
 Ri Ok Hwa

Musicians
 Merited Artist Choe Mun Ho, conductor
 Merited Actor Pak Chol Jun, trumpet
 Jang Mu Kil, brass
 Pak In Thae, trumpet
 Ko Hwa Son, guitar
 Jon Il, violin
 Pak Man Chol, alto saxophone
 Choe Hwi Thae, saxophone

See also

 List of North Korean musicians
 List of South Korean musicians
 Music of North Korea
 Moranbong Band
 Pochonbo Electronic Ensemble
 Unhasu Orchestra

References

North Korean musical groups
North Korean propagandists
Musical groups established in 1983
1983 establishments in North Korea